The 1964 Arab League summit was the first summit of the Arab League, held in Cairo, Egypt, on 13–16 January 1964 and attended by all thirteen of the then member states: United Arab Republic (Egypt), Iraq, Lebanon, Syria, Saudi Arabia, Jordan, Yemen Arab Republic, Libya, Sudan, Morocco, Tunisia, Kuwait and Algeria.

At the summit, held on the initiative of the United Arab Republic (modern-day Egypt only, following the 1961 secession of Syria from the union), it was decided to carry out planning to resolve inter-Arab conflicts and to adopt common principles regarding the struggle against imperialism and the "aggressive policies" of Israel.  

The key resolutions from the summit were expanded and recorded in a letter to the United Nations eight months later at the 1964 Arab League summit (Alexandria).

Background
At the time, Syria and Palestinian fedayeen called for a rematch of the 1948 Arab-Israeli War, but other Arab states (most notably Egypt under Gamal Abdel Nasser) felt it was not the right moment to strike.  Instead, they agreed on the non-military belligerent tactic of diverting water from the Jordan River so that Israel could not use it. This diversion was called the 1964 Headwater Diversion Plan. It went against the original agreed proposals of the River Jordan by both Israel and the Arabs in the 1955 Unified Johnston Plan, also known as the Jordan Valley Unified Water Plan. This was one of the factors that later precipitated the Six-Day War in 1967.

The immediate catalyst for the summit was Israel's proposed diversion of water from Lake Tiberias. In reaction to Syria's repeated charges of Egyptian reluctance for military confrontation with Israel, Egyptian president Gamal Abdel Nasser (1918–1970) championed an Arab plan to divert two sources of the River Jordan, the Hasbani River and the Banias. Nasser blamed Arab divisions for what he deemed "the disastrous situation". This had been the chosen option out of two proposals of the 1964 Headwater Diversion Plan. On 23 December 1963, he said:

In order to confront Israel, which challenged us last week when its chief-of-staff stood up and said "we shall divert the water against the will of the Arabs and the Arabs can do what they want", a meeting between Arab Kings and Heads of State must take place as soon as possible, regardless of the conflicts and differences between them. Those with whom we are in conflict, we are prepared to meet; those with whom we have a quarrel, we are ready, for the sake of Palestine, to sit with.

Participants 
The participants in the meeting were recorded in a letter to the United Nations as follows:

 : King Hussein of Jordan
 : de facto Prime Minister Bahi Ladgham
 : President Ahmed Ben Bella
 : President Ibrahim Abboud
 : President Abdul Salam Arif
 : Prince Faisal of Saudi Arabia (later King)
 Syria: President Amin al-Hafiz
 : President Gamal Abdel Nasser (technically President of the United Arab Republic)
  (North Yemen) President Abdullah as-Sallal 
 : Prince Abdullah III Al-Salim Al-Sabah
 : President Charles Helou
 : King Idris of Libya
 : Prince Moulay Abdallah of Morocco
 : Ahmad Shukeiri

A number of key Arab states had not yet achieved independence from Britain in 1964, and therefore their leaders did not participate in the conference:

 : Emir Isa bin Salman Al Khalifa
 : Sultan Said bin Taimur of Muscat and Oman
 : Emir Ahmad bin Ali Al Thani
 : Emirs of the Trucial States
 : Sultans of the Federation of South Arabia and the Protectorate of South Arabia

Resolutions and effects
On Palestine, Ahmad al-Shuqayri (1908–1988), a Palestinian diplomat and a former assistant secretary-general of the Arab League (1950–1956), was given a mandate to initiate contacts aimed at establishing a Palestinian entity, in which role he would eventually become first chairman of the Palestine Liberation Organization.

On the military front, Cairo Radio announced that the leaders of the Arab League member states agreed to set up a unified military command, the United Arab Command, to be headed by an Egyptian lieutenant general, Ali Ali Amer, and with headquarters in Cairo. No mention of this new body was made in the official communiqué from the summit, although the secretary-general himself, Abdel Khalek Hassouna, had stated that certain adopted resolutions would remain secret.

On the water diversion plan, all thirteen member states unanimously resolved to approve Nasser's proposal. The effect of the summit and the decisions taken there was to emasculate the Council of the Arab League and supersede it as the foremost decision-making body. Nasser discouraged Syria and Palestinian guerrillas from provoking the Israelis, conceding that he had no plans for war with Israel. 

During the summit, Nasser developed cordial relations with King Hussein, and ties were mended with the rulers of Saudi Arabia, Syria, and Morocco. The summit was to be the first of many: in late 1964, a second summit (1964 Arab League summit (Alexandria)) would be held in Alexandria, also in Egypt. Following this second summit, a letter was sent to the United Nations setting out the agreed resolutions.

References

Bibliography
 

1964 Arab League summit (Cairo)
1964 in Egypt
Diplomatic conferences in Egypt
20th-century diplomatic conferences
1964 in international relations
Arab League
1960s in Cairo
January 1964 events in Africa
1964 conferences